Mondésir is a French language surname.

List of people with the surname 

 Edmond Mondesir (born 1948), Martiniquais musician
 Keith Mondesir (born 1948), Saint Lucian politician
 Manuéla Kéclard-Mondésir (born 1971), French politician from Martinique
 Mark Mondesir (born 1964), English jazz drummer
 Merwin Mondesir (born 1976), Canadian actor
 Michael Mondesir (born 1966), English jazz bass guitarist and composer
 Nérilia Mondésir (born 1999), Haitian footballer

See also 

 Mondésir Alladjim (born 1986), Chadian footballer
 Mon Desir restaurant

Surnames
French-language surnames
Surnames of French origin